David Lafayette Toney (October 1857 – June 23, 1914) was an American politician who served in the Virginia House of Delegates.

References

External links 

1857 births
1914 deaths
Members of the Virginia House of Delegates
19th-century American politicians
20th-century American politicians